Futbolo klubas ROMAR, commonly known as ROMAR, was a Lithuanian football club in Mažeikiai, in the center of Mažeikiai District.

History
Club was created in 1992. When some football people from Mažeikiai asked sponsorship for football club Mažeikiai (also known as FK Jovaras).

Lithuanian businessman Romas Marcinkevičius established new football club and named it ROMAR FC. This club could buy new players and got promoted (Jovaras/Mažeikiai was in A lyga, so ROMAR took that place in A lyga). In 1993 was in 6th place, in 1994 they became a champions of Lithuania. In 1994/1995 season they was in 3rd place. But after that Romas Marcinkevičius left Lithuania and went to Canada, and the club lost general sponsor. Club began 1995/1996 season of A lyga, but without sponsorship they were dissolved from any competition. Team defunct in 1995.

ROMAR seasons 
{|class="wikitable"
|-bgcolor="#efefef"
! Season
! League
! Tier
! Place
! Played
! Won
! Drawn
! Lost
! Goals+
! Goals-
! Points
! Cup
!colspan=2|Europe
! Notes
|-
|align=left colspan=14| 
|-bgcolor=LightCyan
|align=center| 1992–93
|align=center| A lyga
|align=center| I 
|align=center| 6
|align=center| 27
|align=center| 11
|align=center| 4
|align=center| 12
|align=center| 27
|align=center| 27
|align=center| 36
|align=center| 1/4 f.
|align=center|
|align=center|
|align=center|
|-
|-bgcolor=LightCyan
|align=center| 1993–94
|align=center| A lyga
|align=center| I 
|align=center bgcolor=gold|1
|align=center| 	22
|align=center|  17	
|align=center| 	4
|align=center| 	1
|align=center| 	53
|align=center|  10	
|align=center| 38
|align=center| 1/2 f.
|align=center| 
|align=center| 
|align=center|
|-bgcolor=LightCyan
|align=center| 1994–95
|align=center| A lyga
|align=center| I 
|align=center| 3
|align=center| 	22
|align=center| 	15
|align=center| 	4
|align=center| 	3
|align=center| 	51
|align=center| 	14
|align=center| 34
|align=center| 1/2 f.
|align=center| 
|align=center| 
|align=center|
|-bgcolor=LightCyan
|align=center| 1995–96
|align=center| A lyga
|align=center| I
|align=center| x
|align=center| 	x
|align=center| 	x
|align=center| 	x
|align=center| 	x
|align=center| 	x
|align=center|  x	
|align=center|  x
|align=center| x
|align=center| 
|align=center| 
|align=center|
|}

Achievements

Domestic
 Lithuanian Championship:
Champions - 1 
1993–94
3rd place - 1 
1994–95

Stadium
Club played their home matches in Mažeikiai Stadium.

References

External links
 FKA
 UEFA
 futbolinis.lt
 foot.dk
 foot.dk

Defunct football clubs in Lithuania
Association football clubs established in 1992
Association football clubs disestablished in 1995
1992 establishments in Lithuania
1995 disestablishments in Lithuania